is a former Japanese football player. Kota Fujimoto is his brother.

Playing career
Dai Fujimoto joined the J2 League club Roasso Kumamoto in 2013. In August 2014, he moved to Renofa Yamaguchi FC. In 2015, he moved back to Roasso Kumamoto.

References

External links

1990 births
Living people
Ryutsu Keizai University alumni
Association football people from Kumamoto Prefecture
Japanese footballers
J2 League players
Japan Football League players
Roasso Kumamoto players
Renofa Yamaguchi FC players
Association football defenders